David Brophy (born 9 June 1990) is a Scottish professional boxer who held the Commonwealth super-middleweight title in 2017.

Career 
Brophy made his professional debut in February 2011 defeating James Tucker on points in Wishaw, Scotland.

On 17 March 2017 Brophy beat Zac Dunn by TKO in the seventh round and won the Commonwealth (British Empire) super middleweight title.

On 27 November 2019 Brophy announced his retirement from professional boxing, following advice from doctors regarding a prevalent eye issue.

Record

References

External links
 

Living people
1990 births
Scottish male boxers
Super-middleweight boxers